This list of Hunt family members of Vermont includes notable members of an American family that was involved in political and fine arts circles in the 18th, 19th, and 20th centuries. The family was primarily based in the town of Brattleboro, Vermont.

Notable family members 
 Richard Morris Hunt – American architect
 William Morris Hunt – artist and painter
 Jonathan Hunt, Sr. – Vermont politician
 Jonathan Hunt, Jr. – Vermont politician and Congressman
 Leavitt Hunt – attorney, politician and photographer
 Jarvis Hunt – Chicago architect
 Richard Howland Hunt – architect and son/successor of Richard Morris Hunt
 Joseph Howland Hunt – architect; brother and partner of Richard Howland Hunt in the firm of Hunt & Hunt

References 

Hunt family of Vermont
People from Brattleboro, Vermont
Hunt